Don Delaney (January 3, 1936 – February 16, 2011) was an American professional basketball coach, who served as head coach of the Cleveland Cavaliers in the early 1980s.  Delaney also served as the team's general manager.

Life
Former Cavaliers owner Ted Stepien signed Delaney to a one-year contract to be the team's head coach in March 1981.  Delaney compiled a 7–21 record over the 1980–81 and 1981–82 seasons.

According to the 1980–81 Cleveland Cavaliers media guide, Delaney was the head coach at Lakeland Community College in Kirtland, Ohio, and Dyke College (now Chancellor University) in Cleveland, compiling a 200–101 record over 11 seasons.  At Lakeland, Delaney also served as chairman of the physical education department.

Prior to coaching in college, Delaney was a high school coach at Kirtland High School in Kirtland, Ohio.

He graduated cum laude from Kent State University, where he earned both his bachelor's and master's degrees.

Delaney died on February 16, 2011, at the age of 75.

References

External links
 BasketballReference.com: Don Delaney 

1936 births
2011 deaths
American men's basketball coaches
Cleveland Cavaliers head coaches
Cleveland Cavaliers executives
National Basketball Association general managers
Kent State University alumni
High school basketball coaches in the United States
Junior college men's basketball coaches in the United States
People from Kirtland, Ohio
Basketball coaches from Ohio